is a Japanese law that governs the line of imperial succession, the membership of the imperial family, and several other matters pertaining to the administration of the Imperial Household.  

In 2017, the National Diet changed the law to enable the Emperor to abdicate within three years. With this change, Emperor Akihito abdicated on 30 April 2019.

Passage of the law
The Imperial Household Law was passed during the Shōwa era on January 16, 1947, by the last session of the Imperial Diet. This law superseded the Imperial Household Law of 1889, which had enjoyed co-equal status with the Constitution of the Empire of Japan and could only be amended by the Emperor. The revised statute is subordinate to the Constitution of Japan, which went into effect on May 3, 1947. It develops Chapter 1: Article 2 of the Constitution of Japan, which states: "The Imperial Throne shall be dynastic and succeeded to in accordance with the Imperial House Law passed by the Diet".

Draft and intent
The law was drafted by the government of Shigeru Yoshida, Prime Minister during the American occupation by the Supreme Commander for the Allied Powers, the 1947 statute sought to bring the legislation governing the Imperial Household into compliance with the American-written Constitution.

The law had the effect of dramatically restricting membership in the Imperial Family to the Emperor Hirohito's immediate family, his widowed mother, and the families of his three brothers. It abolished the collateral lines of the Imperial Family, the shinnōke and the ōke, which had traditionally been a pool of potential successors to the throne if the main imperial family failed to produce an heir. The fifty-one members of the eleven cadet branches renounced their Imperial status; and they were formally removed from the Imperial household register and became ordinary citizens on October 14, 1947.

The new law retained the principle of agnatic succession enshrined in the 1889 law and Prussian-influenced constitution during the 19th century Meiji Restoration. The new law further restricted the succession to legitimate-born sons, grandsons, and male line descendants of an Emperor. Previously, an Emperor's sons and grandsons born by concubines and their male line descendants could succeed to the throne. Although Imperial chronologies include eight reigning empresses in the course of Japanese history, their successors were most often selected from amongst the males of the paternal Imperial bloodline, which is why some conservative scholars argue that the women's reigns were temporary and that male-only succession tradition must be maintained in the 21st century.  Empress Genmei (661–721), who was followed on the throne by her daughter, Empress Genshō (680–748), remains the sole exception to this conventional argument.

In addition, the law contained numerous mechanisms to regulate the future size of the Imperial Family, and thus the financial burden on the state.

The chapters of the Imperial Household Law addresses the following:

 The order of succession to the throne
 The establishment of a regency should the Emperor be a minor or suffer from a serious ailment
 The membership of the Imperial Family
 The composition of the Imperial Household Council
 The titles and styles held by the Emperor and members of the imperial family
 The marriages of the Emperor, the Crown Prince, and the princes of the blood; and,
 The rites for Imperial funerals, Imperial mausoleum, and the maintenance of the Imperial Family registry.

Chapter 1: Article 1 of the Imperial Household Law states: "The Imperial Throne shall be succeeded to by a male offspring in the male line belonging to the Imperial Lineage". The line of succession is detailed in Article 2 as:

 The eldest son of the Emperor 
 The eldest son of the Emperor's eldest son 
 Other descendants of the eldest son of the Emperor 
 The second son of the Emperor and his descendants 
 Other descendants of the Emperor 
 Brothers of the Emperor and their descendants 
 Uncles of the Emperor and their descendants 

Matters relating to regency and membership of the Imperial Family are managed by the Imperial Household Council as stated under this law.

See also
Emperor of Japan
Imperial House of Japan
Japanese succession debate
2019 Japanese imperial transition

References

External links
 The Constitution of Japan
 The Imperial Household Law of 1947
Japanese Editorial Excerpts - Japan Policy & Politics, 29 December 2004

Cold War treaties
Japanese monarchy
Japanese legislation
1947 in law
1947 in Japan